European Rail Infrastructure Managers (EIM) is a sector association that represents the interests of European rail infrastructure managers. Members consist of owners/managers of infrastructure from most European/EEA countries. 
EIM was formally established in 2002 following the liberalisation of the EU railway market to promote the interests of independent rail infrastructure managers in the EU and the EEA.
EIM is a founding member of the Platform for European Rail Infrastructure Managers (PRIME), a member of the Group of Representative Bodies and a member of the Management Board of the European Union Agency for Railways (ERA).

Purpose
The role of EIM is to provide a single voice to represent its members vis-à-vis the relevant European institutions and sector stakeholders. EIM also assists members in developing their businesses through the sharing of experiences and contributing to the technical and safety activities of the European Union Agency for Railways (ERA).

Organisational structure
Based in Brussels, EIM is registered as an international, non-profit association under Belgian law. EIM is led by a President and three Vice-Presidents, who are elected for two-year terms. The President, the Vice-Presidents and the Executive Director form the Board of Directors. The General Assembly is the highest and final governance authority of the association. It gathers normally twice a year. 
Members meet informally at the highest level to share experiences and discuss matters of common importance at the CEOs Club meetings which usually take place twice a year.
The Executive-Director leads the Secretariat which consists of three organizational units employing an international staff of approximately ten people. Members are represented at EIM via the Policy and Management Committee (PMC) for the policy activities and via the Technical Steering Group (TSG) for technical matters. 
The PMC and the TSG may be assisted by internal working groups to address specific questions and to monitor special areas of interest. 
EIM currently has 13 Working Groups whose work is being co-ordinated and supervised by the TSG. The Working Groups frequently interact with their equivalents in the European Union Agency for Railways, which is aiming to create an efficient railway network in Europe by promoting interoperability and common standards for railways.

Members
The following are full members of EIM (voting rights):
  - Adif
  - Banedanmark
  - Finnish Transport Infrastructure Agency
  - High Speed 1
  - Infrabel
  - Bane NOR
  - Network Rail
  - ProRail
  - IP
  - SNCF Réseau
  - Trafikverket
  - PKP Polskie Linie Kolejowe

The following are associate members of EIM (no voting rights):

  - Getlink (formerly Groupe Eurotunnel)
  - LISEA consortium (consisting of VINCI Concessions (leader), the Caisse des Dépôts with its subsidiary CDC Infrastructure and AXA Private Equity)
  - HS2
  - Network Rail High-Speed
  - Solidarity Transport Hub Poland

Activities
EIM's main areas of interest include: 

EU Policy
 EU regulatory framework for railways: the first, second, third and fourth packages
 EU measures aimed at harmonizing, among others, track access charges (TAC), ERTMS modulated TAC, noise-differentiated charging, framework agreements, access to service facilities
 Proposal for a Fourth Railway Package
 TEN-T and CEF
 Urban Mobility
 Intelligent Transport Systems
 Environment
 White Paper for Transport
 Shift2Rail

Technical issues
 Infrastructure (INF)
 Cross acceptance (XA)
 Operations (OPE)
 ERTMS Change Control Management (ERTMS)
 Persons with Reduced Mobility (PRM)
 Train Detection Compatibility (TDC)
 Safety (SAF)
 Locomotives and Passenger Rolling Stock (LOC&PAS)
 Energy (ENE)
 Security (SEC)
 Telecom (TEL)
 Register of Infrastructure (RINF)
 Telematic Applications for Passengers and Freight (TAP&TAF)

Business
 Asset management
 Development of KPIs
 Digital railways
 Research & Development

References

External links
EIM
LinkedIn 
Twitter
Twitter

Transport industry associations
Rail infrastructure in Europe
Railway infrastructure managers
International organisations based in Belgium
Railway associations
Transport organisations based in Belgium